The Islamic Republic of Iran Government's Reciprocal and Proportional Action in Implementing the JCPOA Act is a bill that was passed by Iran's Islamic Consultative Assembly to allow the Government of Hassan Rouhani implement the Joint Comprehensive Plan of Action (JCPOA). The act repealed Iran Nuclear Achievements Protection Act. The bill was introduced after 5 of the 15 members of Majlis special commission for examining the JCPOA issued a joint statement criticizing the commission report and lawmakers voted against fast-tracking the bill to the extent recommended by the report.

Content 
Article 1 of the bill forbids either the production or application of nuclear weapons by Iran based on the fatwa issued by the Supreme Leader Ayatollah Khamenei and obliges the government, particularly Atomic Energy Organization and Ministry of Foreign Affairs to participate in international efforts aimed at countering the threat of such weapons.

The remaining articles laid emphasis on, among other things, cooperation and mutual respect between the two sides of Joint Comprehensive Plan of Action, the government's mindfulness of potential failure in removing the sanctions against Iran or reversing them, and the prevention of access by the International Atomic Energy Agency (IAEA) to military sites unless allowed by Supreme National Security Council.

Votes

International reactions 
  High Representative of the European Union for Foreign Affairs and Security Policy Federica Mogherini welcomed approving the bill.

See also 
 Iran Nuclear Achievements Protection Act
 Iran Nuclear Agreement Review Act of 2015, passed by the United States Congress
 The Act to confronting the hostile actions of the Zionist regime against peace and security
 The Act to Obliging the Government to Provide Comprehensive Support to the Oppressed Palestinian People

References 

2015 in Iran
Presidency of Hassan Rouhani
Nuclear program of Iran
Law of Iran